Vic or Victor Harris is the name of:
Victor Harris (composer) (1869–1943), American composer and conductor
Vic Harris (outfielder) (1905–1978), player/manager in Negro league baseball
Vic Harris (snooker player) (1945–2015), English snooker player
Vic Harris (utility player) (born 1950), Major League Baseball utility player
Macho Harris (Victor Harris Jr., born 1986), American football player